John Ruuka (born 13 August 1995) is an I-Kiribati sprinter. He competed at the 2016 Summer Olympics in the men's 100 metres race; his time of 11.65 seconds in the preliminary round did not qualify him for the first round.

References

External links
 

1995 births
Living people
I-Kiribati male sprinters
Olympic athletes of Kiribati
Athletes (track and field) at the 2016 Summer Olympics